Adam Gorgoni (born 16 December 1963 in New York City) is a prolific composer of film and TV scores and has composed music for over 20 films, including Candyman: Day of the Dead, Waiting..., The Dead Girl, Breakable You, Starting Out in the Evening and Aliens in America.

References

External links

Living people
1963 births
American film score composers
American television composers
American male film score composers